Esther Kenworthy Waterhouse (1857–1944), born Esther Maria Kenworthy, was a British artist who exhibited her flower-paintings at the Royal Academy in London and elsewhere.

Waterhouse was the daughter of James Lees Kenworthy, an artist and schoolmaster from Ealing, in West London; and Elizabeth, a school-mistress. She married her fellow artist John William Waterhouse at the parish church in Ealing, in 1883, and thereafter used the name Esther Kenworthy Waterhouse.  Initially, they lived in a purpose built artistic colony in Primrose Hill, where the houses had studios. In around 1900, they moved to St John's Wood. Waterhouse exhibited her flower paintings at the Royal Academy and with the Royal Society of British Artists in London.

Waterhouse is buried, along with her husband, at Kensal Green Cemetery, and his portrait of her is now owned by Sheffield City Art Galleries.

References

External links
Esther Kenworthy Waterhouse, portrait, Waterhouse

1857 births
1944 deaths
British women painters
Burials at Kensal Green Cemetery
Painters from London
19th-century British painters
20th-century British painters
19th-century British women artists
20th-century British women artists